Phorcus articulatus is a species of sea snail, a marine gastropod mollusk in the family Trochidae, the top snails.

Description
The height of the shell varies between 15 mm and 28 mm, its diameter between 21 mm and 24 mm. The shell is imperforate in the adult, generally perforate when immature. It is heavy and thick and has an elongate-conical shape. Its color is cinereous greenish or whitish, spirally traversed by bands composed of alternating white and black purplish or red squarish spots. The intervals between the bands are longitudinally closely lineolate with blackish. The spire is elevated. The shell contains about 6 whorls. The upper ones are slightly convex, the last generally constricted and concave below the suture, then convex. The spiral impressed grooves or lines are like those of Phorcus turbinatus in the young, but become generally obsolete in adult specimens. The aperture has the same shape as in Phorcus turbinatus, but is smaller and less oblique.

Distribution
This species occurs in the following locations:
 European waters (ERMS scope)
 Greek Exclusive Economic Zone
 Portuguese Exclusive Economic Zone
 Spanish Exclusive Economic Zone

References

 Gmelin J. F., 1791: Carli Linnaei systema Naturae per regna tria naturae. Editio decimatertia, aucta, reformata, Vermes Testacea; Leipzig [Lipsiae] 1 (6): 3021-3910 [molluschi].
 Salis Marschlins C. U. von, 1793: Reisen in verschieden Provinzen den Königreischs Neapel; Zurich and Leipzig, Ziegler Vol. I: pp. 442 + 10 pl. 
 Lamarck ([J.-B. M.] de), 1815-1822: Histoire naturelle des animaux sans vertèbres; Paris [vol. 5: Paris, Deterville/Verdière] [vol. 6 published by the Author] 7 vol. [I molluschi sono compresi nei vol. 5-7. Vol. 5 (Les Conchiferes): 612 pp. [25 luglio 1818]. Vol. 6 (1) (Suite): 343 pp. [1819]. Vol. 6 (2) (Suite): 232 pp. [1822]. Vol. 7: (Suite): 711 pp. [1822]] 
 Payraudeau B. C., 1826: Catalogue descriptif et méthodique des Annelides et des Mollusques de l'île de Corse ; Paris pp. 218 + 8 pl. 
 Risso A., 1826-1827: Histoire naturelle des principales productions de l'Europe Méridionale et particulièrement de celles des environs de Nice et des Alpes Maritimes Paris, Levrault Vol. 1: XII + 448 + 1 carta [1826]. Vol. 2: VII + 482 + 8 pl. (fiori) [novembre 1827]. Vol. 3: XVI + 480 + 14 pl. (pesci) [settembre 1827]. Vol. 4: IV + 439 + 12 pl. (molluschi) [novembre 1826]. Vol. 5: VIII + 400 + 10 pl. (altri invertebrati) [Novembre 1827] 
 Récluz C. A., 1843: Catalogue descriptif de plusieurs nouvelles espèces de coquilles de France suivi d'observations sur quelques autres; Revue zoologique, par la Société Cuvierienne 6: 5-12, 104-112, 228-238, 257-261.
 Bucquoy E., Dautzenberg P. & Dollfus G., 1882-1886: Les mollusques marins du Roussillon. Tome Ier. Gastropodes; Paris, J.B. Baillière & fils 570 p., 66 pl
 Monterosato T. A. (di), 1888-1889: Molluschi del Porto di Palermo. Specie e varietà ; Bullettino della Società Malacologica Italiana, Pisa 13 (1888[1889?]): 161-180 14 (1889): 75-81
 Pallary P., 1900: Coquilles marines du littoral du Départment d'Oran; Journal de Conchyliologie 48 (3): 211-422, pl. 6-8
 Pallary P., 1902: Liste des mollusques testacés de la baie de Tanger; Journal de Conchyliologie 50: 1-39, pl. 1
 Monterosato T. A. (di), 1917: Molluschi viventi e quaternari raccolti lungo le coste della Tripolitania dall'Ing. Camillo Crema ; Bollettino Zoologico Italiano Ser. 3, 4: 1-28, pl. 1 (fig. 1-35)
 Pallary P., 1938: Les Mollusques marins de la Syrie; Journal de Conchyliologie 82: 5-58, pl. 1-2
 Nordsieck F., 1974: Il genere Osilinus Philippi, 1847 nei mari europei; La Conchiglia 9-10 (67-68): 21-23

External links
 To World Register of Marine Species
 

articulatus
Gastropods described in 1822